Sikandar Abu Zafar (19 March 1919 – 5 August 1975) was a Bangladeshi journalist and poet.

Early life and education
Zafar passed the entrance examination in 1936 from Tala B Dey Institute in Satkhira. He received his IA degree from Ripon College, Calcutta (later renamed to Surendranath College).

He moved to Dhaka from Calcutta in 1950 and worked as a journalist for the dailies Nabajug, Ittefaq, Sangbad and Millat. He founded and edited a monthly magazine called Samakal during 1959–1970.

Awards
 Bangla Academy Literary Award (1966)
 Ekushey Padak (1984)
 Independence Day Award

References

1910s births
1975 deaths
Recipients of the Ekushey Padak
Recipients of the Independence Day Award
Bangladeshi journalists
20th-century Bangladeshi poets
Bangladeshi male poets
Recipients of Bangla Academy Award
20th-century male writers
People from Satkhira District
20th-century journalists